Hölder:
 Hölder, Hoelder as surname
 Hölder condition
 Hölder's inequality
 Hölder mean
 Jordan–Hölder theorem